Aisin Gioro Yongxing (永瑆; 22 March 1752 – 10 May 1823) was the Qianlong Emperor's 11th son and Qing Dynasty imperial prince.

Biography 
Yongxing was born on 22 March 1752 to Imperial Noble Consort Shujia , a member of Korean Jin clan. Yongxing was considered to be one of the most talented sons of the Qianlong Emperor. He had good relationship with 12th prince Yongji and 15th prince Yongyan in his childhood. He was known for his calligraphy, that's why he was commissioned by his half-brother to create plaques and stellas in the Yu Mausoleum of Eastern Qing tombs. His first work was "Lyrics of Peaceful Summer", dedicated to Empress Xiaoshengxian. Empress Dowager expressed her fondness of that work by creating a library named Yijingzhai, after that Yongxing chose his art name. The prince later wrote cycle of poems named after his studio. Furthermore, his literary works included "Listening to the Rain" and "Series of Ancient Dragon". Yongxing was particularly famous for relationship with top artisans of Qianlong era, such as Weng Fanggang, Liu Yong and Tiebao (member of Donggo clan), which earned a name of "Four Schools of Qianlong era".

He was granted the title Prince Cheng of the First Rank in 1789. In 1792, Minister of War Qinggui used Yongyan's letter to Yongxing in the entry of his memorial. Qinggui was accused of disrespect and punished for his action. In 1799, Yongxing was appointed as a member of Council of State and subsequently tasked with overseeing Ministry of Revenue. In 1813, when Eight Trigrams attempted to storm the Forbidden City, Yongxing supported his nephew in killing the uprisers. In 1819, he was dismissed of his duties due to offensive behaviour. In 1820, when Jiaqing Emperor became severely ill in Chengde Mountain Resort, he was summoned back to Beijing. In 1822, he presented a set of 16 ritual vessels to the imperial court. Yongxing died on 10 May 1823 and was posthumously honoured as Prince Chengzhe of the First Rank (， meaning "virtuous and sagacious").

Family 
Yongxing was married to Fuheng's daughter, Lady Fuca. Later, he took his palace maid Duanyun as a secondary consort, following example of Yongxuan, who also took his servant as a concubine.

Princess consort spent monthly 817 taels of silver in 1795, more than Crown Princess, who spent only 290 taels of silver. In 1796, after the promotion of lady Hitara, spendings of Yongxing's consorts were lower than expenses of imperial court.

Primary Consort

 Primary consort, of the Fuca clan (嫡福晋 富察氏; d. 1813)
 Mianqin, Prince Cheng of the Second Rank (16 October 1768 – 20 July 1820), first son
 First daughter (13 January 1770 – 15 July 1771)
 Mianyi, Prince of the Third Rank  (27 October 1771 – 26 February 1809), second son adopted by Yongzhang
 Third daughter (13 August 1775 – 22 August 1783)

Secondary Consort

 Secondary consort, of the Tatara clan (侧福晋 他他拉氏)
 Sixth daughter (13 November 1793 – 16 May 1794)
 Mianbin, Defender general (22 October 1796 – 7 February 1841), seventh son

 Duanyun, secondary consort of the Liugiya clan (侧福晋 刘佳氏 端云)
 Princess of the Fourth Rank (9 March 1770 – 1 February 1800), second daughter
 Married Dewei of the Aohan Borjigin clan in January 1786
 Miancong, Lesser bulwar Duke  (14 February 1775 – 2 April 1828), third son
 Princess of the Fourth Rank (b. 15 January 1776), fourth daughter
 Married Bozhechentian of the Nara clan

 Secondary consort, of the Ligiya clan (侧福晋 李佳氏)
 Miansi, Prince of the Third Rank  (17 April 1776 – 7 December 1848), fourth son adopted by Yongji
 Mianke (10 July 1777 – 4 December 1777), fifth son

Concubine

 Mistress, of the Yi clan (使女 伊氏)
 Lady of the Second Rank (b. 12 February 1783), fifth daughter
 Married Linaxi of the Khorchin league
 Sixth son (7 July 1785 – 29 August 1786)

Art names 
Personal name: Yongxing (永瑆)

First art name: Shaochan (少厂）, literally "Little Cliff"

Second art name: Jingquan (竟泉), literally "Mirror-like water spring"

Third art name: Yijingzhai zhuren (诒竟斋主人), literally "Master of the Studio of Promulgating Ascension"

Family tree

References

Further reading 

Qing dynasty imperial princes
Prince Cheng
Chinese princes
Qianlong Emperor's sons
1752 births
1823 deaths